Ele Keats (born Elemy Georgescu; August 24, 1973) is an American television, film and stage actress, model, and jewelry designer.  Keats's most notable roles were in the Disney musical drama film Newsies, Garry Marshall's Frankie and Johnny, the biographical survival drama Alive, Steven Soderbergh's Eros and the horror film Insidious: Chapter 3. She has also appeared in more than one hundred national TV commercials.

Acting career
Born in Paris, France, to copywriter Sacha Georgescu (of Romanian descent) and Ford model Jan McGuire, Keats was raised in New York City, Europe and Los Angeles. She began her professional career as a young model, being featured in publications such as American Baby, Ladies' Home Journal & Teen Magazine.

After moving to Los Angeles she launched her acting career at fifteen, being featured in a Michael Jackson Pepsi commercial and in 1988 she appeared in LL Cool J's Going Back to Cali music video, directed by Ric Menello.

Quickly establishing herself as a familiar face on television, Keats has appeared in more than one hundred TV commercials, including the 1990 Levi's jeans beach ad.

She trained theatrically in New York and in Los Angeles under Gene Bua and Fran Rosen, among others, and starred in plays such as Seven Sided Circle, at the Gene Bua Theatre and Music, America. Small television roles quickly followed, including the pilot for The Outsiders, produced by Francis Ford Coppola and a recurring part in the CBS sitcom Dear John starring Judd Hirsch.

When she was still in her teens, Keats landed a regular role in Fox's daily soap opera Tribes as Anny, a pregnant teen girl. The same year she made her feature film debut with a featured role in The Rocketeer.

A rapid succession of bigger roles followed in films such as There Goes My Baby (filmed in 1990 but released in 1994 due to Orion Pictures' bankruptcy),  Garry Marshall's Frankie and Johnny (opposite Al Pacino and Michelle Pfeiffer), the Disney musical Newsies as Sarah Jacobs, love interest of Christian Bale's Jack Kelly, and Frank Marshall's acclaimed drama Alive.

During the 1990s, Keats landed leading and supporting role in television and independent projects such as Lipstick Camera, the thriller-drama I Shot a Man in Vegas, Disney Channel's White Wolves II: Legend of the Wild, Frank LaLoggia's thriller The Haunted Heart (later re-named Mother, starring Diane Ladd and Olympia Dukakis) and the CBS prime-time drama Race Against Time: the Search of Sarah (in the title role). She also landed a regular role in the Fox sci-fi series White Dwarf, again produced by Francis Ford Coppola, but the pilot wasn't picked up to series and it aired as a TV movie in May 1995. In addition, she appeared in numerous popular TV series, including Diagnosis: Murder, Class of '96, Touched by an Angel and MTV's Undressed.

In 2001, she played Michelle Phillips' daughter in the independent film March and  subsequently landed the role of the mysterious woman in Steven Soderbergh's Eros (opposite Robert Downey Jr.), which debuted at the Venice Film Festival in 2004. Other roles include the leads in Heidi Van Leer's indie comedies Monday and American Decaf. On television, she guest-starred in renowned series such as CSI: Crime Scene Investigation, CSI: NY, Cold Case and Greek and continued to appear in numerous national TV commercials for brands such as Nissan, AT&T, Petco, Firestone and Kellogg's. She also starred in the stage production The Vagina Monologues in Los Angeles.

In 2014 she starred in Snowflake, a critically acclaimed short film shot in New York City opposite Tracy Middendorf. She later booked roles in the Blumhouse horror films Insidious: Chapter 3 (as Lillith Brenner) and Ouija: Origin of Evil.

In 2017, she played Adam Baldwin's wife Christine in The Last Ship and in 2018 had a role in the mid-season finale of CBS's NCIS.

Jewelry design career
Apart from her job as an actress, Keats has launched her own jewelry line in 2005, Ele Keats Jewelry. As a jewelry designer, Keats specializes in inspirational and birthstone designs and works only with ethical stones. 
Her creations have been featured in several magazines, worn in many movies and TV shows and received an overwhelming response from celebrity clientele, who praise her inspirational designs as “simply stunning.” 

Keats counts Diane Keaton, Elizabeth Berkley, Poppy Montgomery, Carla Gugino, Jessica Biel, Laura Dern, Stefanie Scott, Cameron Diaz, and Mandy Moore among her clients.

The Ele Keats Jewelry official shop was opened in 2013 in Brentwood, Los Angeles. Renamed Ele Keats Jewelry Lifestyle Experience, the shop relocated in a new, wider space in Santa Monica, California in 2016.

Personal life
Keats is a vegan and has been practicing yoga and meditation for more than 20 years. Her sister is actress Caitlin Keats and her cousin is actress Illeana Douglas.

Filmography

Film

Television

References

External links
 
 
 
 

1973 births
Living people
20th-century American actresses
21st-century American actresses
American activists
American child actresses
American child models
American female models
American film actresses
American stage actresses
American television actresses
American people of Romanian descent
American jewelry designers
Women jewellers